The kos, also spelled coss, koss, kosh, krosh, and krosha, is a unit of measurement which is derived from a Sanskrit term, which means a 'call', as the unit was supposed to represent the distance at which another human could be heard. It is an ancient Indian subcontinental standard unit of distance, in use since at least 4 BCE.

Another conversion is based on the Mughal emperor Akbar, who standardized the unit to 5000 guz in the Ain-i-Akbari. Another conversion suggested a kos to be approximately 2 English miles.

Arthashastra Standard units

The "Arthashastra: Chapter XX. "Measurement of space and time", authored in 4th century BC by Chanakya (Vishnugupta Kauṭilya), sets this standard breakup of Indian units of length:

 1 angul (approximate width of a finger) = approx. 
 4 angul = 1 dhanurgrah (bow grip) = 
 8 angul = 1 dhanurmushti (fist with thumb raised) = 
 12 angul = 1 vitastaa (span-distance of stretched out palm between the tips of a person's thumb and the little finger) = 
 2 vitastaa (from the tip of the elbow to the tip of the middle finger) = 1 aratni or hast (cubit or haath) = 
 4 aratni (haath) = 1 dand or dhanush (bow) = ;
 10 dand = 1 rajju = 
 2 rajju = 1 paridesh = 
 10 rajju = 1 goruta = 
 10 goruta= 1 krosha/kos = nearly

Conversion to SI units and imperial units
Kos may also refer to roughly  Arthashastra standard unit of kos or krosha is equal to 3075 metres in SI units and 1.91 miles in imperial units.

Usage of kos
Evidence of official usage exists from the Vedic period to the Mughal era. Elderly people in many rural areas of the Indian subcontinent still refer to distances from nearby areas in kos. Most Hindu religious Parikrama circuits are measured in kos, such as 48 kos parikrama of Kurukshetra. Along India's old highways, particularly the Grand Trunk Road, one still finds 16th to early 18th century Kos Minars, or mile markers, erected at distances of a little over two miles.

See also

 Measurement
 Hasta, unit of smaller distance
 Yojana, unit of longer distance
 Palya, unit of time
 Vedic metre, measurement of rhythmic structure of verses
 Hindu units of time
 Indian weights and measures
 History of measurement systems in India
 Other related
 Hindu astronomy
 Hindu calendar
 Hindu cosmology
 Indian mathematics
 Indian science and technology
 List of numbers in Hindu scriptures

References

Customary units in India
Hindu astronomy
Indian mathematics
Obsolete units of measurement
Units of length